Beñat Urkiola Irulegi (born 1998) is a Spanish singer and bertsolari.

He was the winner of the ETB 1 talent show Egin kantu!, which brought him great notoriety in the Basque Country and Spain.

He made his debut at the age of ten in Betizu on the ETB 1 channel, being one of several Betizu artists (a former Betizu Star).

Life and career 

He was born in Leitza. Since he was little he studied at the Music School of Leitza (Navarra). There he studied solfeggio, transverse flute and guitar. He was also a member of the Leitza Choir. He was also trained in Basque music and dance from a young age. 

In the year 2006-2007 he participated in the musical talent contest Egin kantu! from ETB 1 and was the winner of the talent. The grand final of the talent took place at the Gazteszena theater in San Sebastián. In the final, Urkiola sang the song "Ilargia" by the group Ken Zazpi with which he went to the next phase and ended up winning the contest.

He recorded the official album of the program, together with Oihan Larraza, Maialen Diez and Ane Gonzalez. In addition to that, as a member of the group, they gave different concerts during the years 2007 and 2008.

Urkiola is also trained as a bertsolari. In 2007, when he was only nine years old, he won a written bertsolarism contest. He regularly participates in bertsolarism and written bertsolarism sessions.

He studied engineering at the IMH of the University of the Basque Country (2016-2020). He is currently an engineer, a profession that he combines with bertsolarism and music.

Private life 
He is the brother of the television presenter Joseba Urkiola.

Discography 

 2007, Egin Kantu (CD)

Filmography

Television 

 Betizu, ETB 1
 Egin kantu!, ETB 1 (winner)

See also 

 Betizu
 Egin kantu!
 Nerea Alias

References

External links 

 

1998 births
Living people
Basque singers
Spanish child singers
Spanish child actors
Bertsolaris
University of the Basque Country alumni